Ulverston is a market town and a civil parish in the South Lakeland district of Cumbria, England. In the 2001 census the parish had a population of 11,524, increasing at the 2011 census to 11,678. Historically in Lancashire, it lies a few miles south of the Lake District National Park and just north-west of Morecambe Bay, within the Furness Peninsula.

History

The name Ulverston, first noted as Ulurestun in the Domesday Book of 1086, consists of an Old Norse personal name, Úlfarr, or the Old English Wulfhere, with the Old English tūn, meaning farmstead or village. The personal names Úlfarr and Wulfhere both imply "wolf warrior" or "wolf army", which explains the presence of a wolf on the town's coat of arms. The loss of the initial W in Wulfhere can be linked to Scandinavian influence in the region. Locally, the town has traditionally been known as Oostan. Other variants include Oluestonam (1127), and Uluereston (1189).

The market charter granted in 1280 by Edward I was for a market on Thursdays. The town retains its market-town appearance; market days are now Thursdays and Saturdays. The charter also allowed public houses to open from 10:30 am to 11:00 pm, regardless of other statute on the books. The present Saturday market includes in the summer craft stalls, charity stalls and locally produced ware on "Made in Cumbria" stalls.

Town Bank Grammar School was founded in 1658 from a benefaction by Thomas Fell. The Victoria Road drill hall opened in 1873.

Historically, the parish included chapelries and townships that later became separate civil parishes: Blawith, Church Coniston, Egton with Newland, Lowick, Mansriggs, Osmotherley, Subberthwaite and Torver. From 1894 to 1974 the town served as an urban district in the administrative county of Lancashire. Under the Local Government Act 1972 it became a successor parish in the Cumbria district of South Lakeland.

The High Carley Hospital and Ulverston Joint Hospital Board built an infectious disease hospital at High Carley, Pennington, in 1884. It was initially a fever hospital for paupers. In 1916 a second hospital, run by Lancashire County Council, was built to treat tubercular patients. From 1949 a children's annexe was built. In the 1950s, as the number of tubercular patients decreased, the hospital was run as an acute hospital. In 1984, after the building of the new Furness General Hospital, High Carley was closed.

In 2009, the comedian Ken Dodd unveiled a statue of Laurel and Hardy (by Graham Ibbeson) outside Coronation Hall in the town centre.

Earthquake
On 28 April 2009, Ulverston was near the epicentre of an earthquake measuring 3.7 on the Richter magnitude scale. Tremors were felt across south Cumbria and parts of north Lancashire at 11.22, but virtually no damage was caused. A spokesman for the British Geological Survey stated that earthquakes of such magnitude occur roughly once a year in Britain. Regionally, it was the strongest seismic event since a magnitude 4.4 earthquake struck Lancaster in 1835.

Governance
Ulverston is within the area of South Lakeland District Council (SLDC) in the county of Cumbria. Some local government responsibilities fall to SLDC, while others are handled by Cumbria County Council. Ulverston Town Council covers some parochial matters.

The town is in the wider civil parish of Ulverston. This is bounded in the east by the Leven estuary, the River Crake, Coniston Water and Yewdale Beck. To the west the boundary follows a chain of hills, and beyond lie the towns of Kirkby-in-Furness and Askam and Ireleth. To the south is relatively low land that rises quickly. In the north are hills such as Coniston Old Man. The parish settlements are mainly in the eastern part.

Places of interest
The Laurel & Hardy Museum is situated in Ulverston.

The limestone Hoad Monument (proper name: the Sir John Barrow Monument) was built in 1850 in honour of the statesman Sir John Barrow. It offers views that include Morecambe Bay and parts of the Lake District.

Education

Ulverston Victoria High School (UVHS), the town's secondary school, with some 1,200 pupils, includes a sixth form college with about 400. There are four main primary schools; Croftlands Junior (secular), St Mary's (Catholic), Church Walk (Church of England) and Sir John Barrow (secular) and a special education school, near Sandside.

Transport

The town's several bus services include the X6 between Kendal and Barrow-in-Furness via Grange-over-Sands, the X12 to Coniston and Spark Bridge, and the 6A and 6 to Barrow-in-Furness.

Twin towns
Ulverston is twinned with Albert in France. They meet alternately at Easter each year to play football for the Cyril Barker Shield.

In July 2016 Ulverston, as the birthplace of the film comedian Stan Laurel, was officially twinned with Harlem, Georgia, United States, birthplace of Laurel's screen partner Oliver Hardy.

Festivals

The many festivals held at Ulverston include:
Another Fine Fest, celebrating Ulverston and the birth of Stan Laurel.
Dickensian Festival.
Furness Tradition.
Retro Rendezvous

Sport

Football
Ulverston Rangers association football team has existed since 1945. It currently plays in the West Lancashire Football League and the Furness Football League.

Rugby League
Ulverston Amateur Rugby League Football Club plays home games at Dragley Beck, it belongs to the North West Counties Rugby League. It has produced several professional rugby players, including Derek Hadley.

Other sports
The town's two field hockey clubs, South Lakes and Ulverston, are based at Ulverston Leisure Centre. The town regularly has events run by Lakeland Orienteering Club. A parkrun event has been held every Saturday at Ford Park since 2018.

International links
The Royal Norwegian Honorary Consulate in Barrow-in-Furness, one of the numerous consulates of Norway, is actually located on the outskirts of Ulverston.

The town of Ulverstone in Tasmania, Australia is named after Ulverston and likewise built at the mouth of a River Leven.

Freedom of the Town
The following people and military units have received the Freedom of the Town of Ulverston.

Individuals
Peter Winston: 15 May 2019.

Military units
The Duke of Lancaster's Regiment: 7 May 2011.
2223 (Ulverston) Squadron Air Training Corps: 18 April 2015.

Notable people
In alphabetical order:
Ella Blaylock Atherton (1860–1933), physician
Cuthbert Bardsley (1907-1991), Anglican bishop of Coventry, was born in Ulveston
Amelia Edith Huddleston Barr (1831–1919), novelist, was born in Ulverston.
Sir John Barrow (1764–1848), statesman, was born at Dragley Beck, he was the Admiralty's Second Secretary. A monument to him; a replica of the third Eddystone Lighthouse, stands on Hoad Hill overlooking the town.
Norman Birkett, 1st Baron Birkett (1883–1962), judge, politician and preacher who served as alternate British judge in the Nuremberg Trials, was born in Ulverston.
Norman Gifford (born 1940), international cricketer
Jess Gillam (born 1998), saxophonist
Maude Green, mother of the Rock and Roll music legend, Bill Haley 
Francis Arthur Jefferson VC (1921–1982), a Victoria Cross-winning soldier born in Ulverston
Stan Laurel (1890–1965), actor born at 3 Argyle Street, Ulverston
Selina Martin (1882–1972), suffragette
Christine McVie (1943–2022), singer and songwriter born in the nearby village of Bouth
James Penny (1741–1799), slave-ship owner, who became a prominent anti-abolitionist
Bob Shaw (1931–1996), science fiction writer, lived in Ulverston. 
William Basil Weston VC (1924–1945), a Victoria Cross-winning officer, was born in Ulverston. There is a memorial to him in the town's Catholic Church.

Gallery

Arms

See also

Listed buildings in Ulverston
Ulverston Canal

References

External links

 Cumbria County History Trust: Ulverston (nb: provisional research only – see Talk page)

Ulverston history at GENUKI
Heritage First (formerly Ulverston Heritage Centre)
Ulverston on the web
Ulverston Victoria High School (UVHS)
Ulverston International Music Festival
Visit Ulverston
Ulverston carnival parade
Ulverston Leisure Centre

 
Towns in Cumbria
Market towns in Cumbria
Furness
Civil parishes in Cumbria
United Kingdom
South Lakeland District